Lakina may refer to:

 Lakina (tribe), Assyria
 Lakina River, Alaska, US
 Soane Patita Lakina, past-president, Territorial Assembly of Wallis and Futuna
Lakena, an island in Tuvalu